WAQE-FM (97.7 FM) is a radio station broadcasting an adult contemporary music format. It is licensed to Barron, Wisconsin, United States.  The station is currently owned by TKC, Inc. and features programming from CBS News Radio and Westwood One.

History
The station was assigned call sign WBFE on July 17, 1998.  On November 16, 1999, the station changed its call sign to WAQE-FM.

References

External links

AQE-FM
Mainstream adult contemporary radio stations in the United States
Radio stations established in 1998